Kodela Siva Prasada Rao  (2 May 1947 – 16 September 2019) was an Indian politician from the Telugu Desam Party and also a former Member of the Legislative Assembly from Sattenapalle.

Beginning 2014 he served for five years as the Speaker of the first Andhra Pradesh Legislative Assembly. In a career spanning three decades, he served as a cabinet minister in the N. T. Rama Rao and N. Chandrababu Naidu governments, serving at various times as Minister of Home Affairs, Health, Major Irrigation department, Panchayat Raj and Rural Development, and Civil Supplies.

Life and education
Kodela Siva Prasada Rao was born in Kandlagunta, Guntur district, Andhra Pradesh, India on 2 May 1947. He and his wife Sasikala had three children, a daughter, and two sons.

He completed his Primary education in Siripuram, Guntur district and studied pre-university at Loyola College, Vijayawada. He graduated with a M.B.B.S. from Guntur Medical College, Guntur, and earned his MS (General Surgery) from Banaras Hindu University.

Positions held
 1983 - 1985 : Member APLA
 1985 - 1989 : Member APLA
 1989 - 1994 : Member APLA
 1994 - 1999 : Member APLA
 1999 - 2003 : Member APLA,
 2014 : Member APLA - Speaker, APLA - Chairman, Business Advisory Committee

AS MEMBER OF LEGISLATIVE ASSEMBLY

 1983 : Elected from Narasaraopet (Assembly constituency)
 1985 : Elected from Narasaraopet (Assembly constituency)
 1989 : Elected from Narasaraopet (Assembly constituency)
 1994 : Elected from Narasaraopet (Assembly constituency)
 1999 : Elected from Narasaraopet (Assembly constituency)
 2014 : Elected from Sattenapalle (Assembly constituency)

AS MINISTER

 1987 - 1988: Minister for Home
 1996 - 1997: Minister for Major & Medium Irrigation
 1997 - 1999: Minister for Panchayat Raj

References

1947 births
2019 deaths
 Speakers of the Andhra Pradesh Legislative Assembly
 Telugu Desam Party politicians
 Andhra Pradesh MLAs 2014–2019
 People from Guntur district
20th-century Indian politicians
 Andhra Pradesh politicians
 Suicides by hanging in India
 Politicians who committed suicide